Nastus is a genus of slender, erect, scrambling or climbing bamboos in the grass family. It is native to Southeast Asia, Papuasia, and certain islands in the Indian Ocean (Madagascar and Réunion).

Species

formerly included
see Arundinaria, Bambusa, Cathariostachys, Cenchrus, Chusquea, Dendrocalamus, Dinochloa, Gigantochloa, Guadua, Melocanna, and  Thamnocalamus

References

External links

Bor, N. L. (1972) A new species of Nastus from New Guinea Plant Systematics and Evolution, 120 (1-2). pp. 87-91. ISSN 0378-2697
The Archives of the Rare Fruit Council of Australia
Camus, A. 1937. Nastus Humberlianus Bambou nouveau de Madagascar. Bulletin de la Société Botanique de France. Vol. 84 (3) 1937

Bambusoideae
Bambusoideae genera